Ruotsalainen is a medium-sized lake of Finland in the Kymijoki main catchment area. it is located in Päijät-Häme, near the town Heinola. There is a waterway crossing the town and connecting the lake to another lake Konnivesi.

See also
List of lakes in Finland

References

Lakes of Heinola